"Grim Grinning Ghosts (The Screaming Song)" is the theme song for The Haunted Mansion franchise and its attractions at Disney theme parks. It was composed by Buddy Baker, with lyrics written by X Atencio. Its melody has been adapted for numerous uses since its composition in the late 1960s.

General overview
"Grim Grinning Ghosts" features Buddy Baker's melody, usually in the key of A minor, with lyrics by Disney legend Xavier "X" Atencio. Different variations use 4/4 or 3/4 for the meter. The following chord progression is used for all versions: Am, B, Am, B, Am, F, Am, F7, Am, E7, Am. Typically, each chord lasts for two beats of 4/4 or three beats of 3/4. This underlying chord progression provides a macabre mood for the Haunted Mansion attractions.  The song modulates to B-flat minor thus: Am, E7, F7, Bm and on to B-minor via Bm, F7 and F7. The melody then modulates back to A-minor after repeating a dissonant chord six times. When recording the song, the organist actually played the song backwards to achieve the discord that the composer intended. The organ part that can be heard in the song is that tune played forwards.

The title comes from William Shakespeare's poem Venus and Adonis:

Look, how the world's poor people are amaz'd
At apparitions, signs, and prodigies,
Whereon with fearful eyes they long have gaz'd,
Infusing them with dreadful prophecies;
So she at these sad sighs draws up her breath,
And, sighing it again, exclaims on Death.

Hard-favour'd tyrant, ugly, meagre, lean,Hateful divorce of love,'—thus chides she Death,—'Grim-grinning ghost', earth's worm, what dost thou mean
To stifle beauty and to steal his breath,
Who when he liv'd, his breath and beauty set
Gloss on the rose, smell to the violet?

Variations

Haunted Mansion
Many different music loops are used throughout the Haunted Mansion attractions at Disneyland, Walt Disney World, and Tokyo Disneyland. Speakers disguised within the sets allow the music to fade in and out as guests pass through the different areas. The following variations of "Grim Grinning Ghosts" can be heard in these attractions.
 Foyer: As guests enter the dimly-lit foyer, a distant organ can be heard. "Grim Grinning Ghosts," played in the slow cadence of a funeral dirge, rumbles through the mansion. This simple arrangement is intended to set the spooky tone for the attraction.  It features melody and bass line on a Robert Morton theater organ and an almost inaudible countermelody on tubular bells.
 Load Area: Guests leave the "Stretch Room" and proceed down either a hall of changing portraits (Disneyland), or into the Entrance Hall (Walt Disney World). One of the ride's most unconventional musical selections plays in the background. An alto flute plays a low rendition of Baker's composition, with tubular bells doubling the melody.  There is also a wind-like sound effect that follows the pitches of the song.
 Music Room/Grand Staircase: In the Walt Disney World and Tokyo Disneyland versions, guests pass by a decrepit music parlor. A shadowy phantom sits at the piano, playing "Grim Grinning Ghosts" as block chords with heavy rubato. This rendition isn't heard in the original Disneyland mansion, but it was recorded during the production of the original attraction. Many sources claim that Buddy Baker himself performed this piece.
 Séance Circle: Guests pass through the ominous Corridor of Doors (while the foyer organ plays again) and enter Madame Leota's Séance Area. A variety of instruments float through the room, including a harp, a tambourine, and a trumpet.  The song's melody hums softly on an organ in the background, while the other instruments fade in and out.
 Ballroom: A -long mezzanine overlooks the mansion's ballroom, which is swarming with translucent ghosts. On the far left, spirits pour from the pipes of an organ prop as "Grim Grinning Ghosts" howls through the ballroom, this time as a waltz. This piece makes use of unusual chords, including minor/major sevenths and cluster chords.  Baker originally approached film organist Gaylord Carter, who had recorded the other organ tracks for the mansion, to improvise for this ballroom waltz; Carter, however, took too sensible an approach with his improvising for Baker's tastes, so Baker took a transcription of Carter's improvisations to William Sabransky. Sabransky then improvised further from the transcription of Carter's own improvisations, producing the effect Baker wanted.
 Graveyard: X Atencio's lyrics are first heard in the graveyard scene. A large number of different music loops play throughout area. Most of them are ghosts singing the lyrics over a background loop that provides the 1960s style bass line and rhythm section. One of the tracks features a harp, trumpet, oboe, flute, and set of stones, which represents the band of ghosts in the graveyard. All four verses are present, with first two in A minor, the third in B♭ minor, and the fourth in B minor. This presentation of "Grim Grinning Ghosts" is by far the loudest and most noticeable in the ride. In early years, the pop up ghosts in the graveyard would loudly scream at the end of each verse. Although the screams were later removed, the ghosts still pop up in time with the end of each verse.
 Exit: Guests exit their Doombuggies and proceed through the exit crypt, which leads back up to the themed land. A final, somber a capella refrain can be faintly heard with different lyrics.

One of the voice talents in the attraction is Thurl Ravenscroft, who was recognizable from other Disney projects, the annual Chuck Jones/Dr. Seuss Christmas special How The Grinch Stole Christmas and as the voice of Tony the Tiger. He leads the five "singing busts" in the graveyard scene with his characteristic voice. A projected film loop is used to animate the busts, with Ravenscroft and the other vocalists appearing as "themselves." The Ravenscroft bust, which is the second one in from the left, is "broken" and has often been misidentified as being an image of Walt Disney himself. The other four voices of the busts are Jay Meyer, Chuck Schroeder, Verne Rowe, and Bob Ebright.

A variation of this song is also used at Disney World's Magic Kingdom HalloWishes fireworks show and Disneyland's Halloween Screams fireworks show. It's also used in parades at Disneyland Paris Resort and Hong Kong Disneyland during the Halloween season.

The seasonal "Haunted Mansion Holiday" overlay at the original Anaheim attraction and Tokyo attraction mixes the tune with Danny Elfman's melody lines from The Nightmare Before Christmas and with Jolly Old Saint Nicholas and Jingle Bells in the graveyard.  One of the most prominent instances of this is a straight orchestral statement of the "Grim grinning ghosts come out to socialize" melody line that plays at the end of the cue for the stretching room.

Phantom Manor
On April 12, 1992, Phantom Manor was opened at Disneyland Park Paris. Based on the original Disneyland ride but with a new backstory tied into Frontierland, Big Thunder Mountain and Thunder Mesa, Phantom Manor featured a more coherent storyline and an all-new orchestral soundtrack by composer John Debney.

Phantom Manor takes a different approach to the same concept as the Haunted Mansion attractions. The intended mood is one of corrupted elegance, rather than morbid kookiness. As a result, the soundtrack is different as well. The regular Haunted Mansion attractions feature music that is usually played or sung by characters in the scenery: an organist's waltz, a graveyard band jamboree, and so on. Phantom Manor, however, has a full orchestral soundtrack that takes a more cinematic approach, although all of the music is based on "Grim Grinning Ghosts."  A variety of instrumentations are used. At various moments, guests hear piano, organ, alto flute, a boy's choir, a jazz band, and a female voice soloist who symbolizes the character of Melanie Ravenswood, all in addition to the ordinary orchestral complement.

In film
Disney released the videos Disney Sing Along Songs: Disneyland Fun – It's a Small World and Disney Sing Along Songs: Let's Go to Disneyland Paris! as it composed the song. 

When Walt Disney Pictures released the 2003 film adaptation, composer Mark Mancina was asked to write the film's music. Like Phantom Manor's soundtrack, the movie score is orchestral and uses "Grim Grinning Ghosts" frequently. However, Mancina used "Grim Grinning Ghosts" in somewhat different ways from Debney, focusing more on relatively light-hearted background music and ominous crescendos of orchestra and organ than on waltz-like passion. = Cues such as the film's overture allowed Mancina to work with both "Grim Grinning Ghosts" and a theme of his own invention.  A scene in the mansion's graveyard also features the attraction's singing busts, whose musical selections include a few lines from the song.  The vast majority of the film's music, though, was never officially released as a soundtrack, though copies of a complete album given to staff and orchestra members can occasionally be found for sale. Four minutes of the score did make it onto the "Haunted Hits" CD release, which groups "Sara Passes Out", the overture, and "Going to Heaven" into one track entitled "Overture from The Haunted Mansion".  However, none of the orchestral and/or organ statements of "Grim Grinning Ghosts" are heard on this album. 

Despite these, the Overture also pays homage to the ride's organ heard in the Foyer and Corridor of Doors, as it is played in a similar style of a funeral dirge, but the melody is done on a cathedral-style organ, with orchestral strings backing it up, creating a more ominous atmosphere.

Other media
The song, appropriately, was used as the BGM for the "Haunted Mansion" race track in Walt Disney World Quest: Magical Racing Tour.
The "Otherworldly Concerto" segment of the song can be heard in the 2015 Disney/Pixar film, Inside Out.
The song can be heard briefly in Toy Story 3: The Video Game in the Toy Box mode. In the Sid's Haunted House level, after clearing the first room, the song plays in a continuous loop until clearing the last room. 
In the House of Mouse episode "House Ghosts", after Pete unleashes them in an attempt to scare the guests out of the club so that he'll be able to shut down the House of Mouse, the Hitchhiking Ghosts perform the song.
Soundtrack releases of the song, such as on the Disneyland album in Walt Disney Records: The Legacy Collection, incorporate the "Otherworldly Concerto", the Ballroom scene music and the lyrics from the Graveyard scene, before concluding with the "Hurry back" lines from the end of the ride.
"Rest in Peace", an original song from Muppets Haunted Mansion, incorporates lyrics from this song towards its climax.
An EDM remix of the song by record producer The Living Tombstone, featuring Corpse Husband and musical artist Crusher P. was published as a single in November 2016.

References

1969 songs
Disney songs
Disney theme park music
Songs about ghosts
Halloween songs
Haunted Mansion
Songs with lyrics by Xavier Atencio
Songs with music by Buddy Baker (composer)
Theme music
Walt Disney Records singles